The second World Cup of Softball was held in Oklahoma City, Oklahoma USA between July 16 and July 20, 2010.  USA won their third World Cup by defeating Australia 3-1 in the Championship game.

Final standings

Position Round

External links
 USA softball website

World Cup of Softball
World Cup Of Softball, 2006